Diffa is one of the seven Regions of Niger, located in the southeast of the country. The capital of the region is Diffa.

Geography 
Diffa Region is situated in the extreme southeast of Niger between 10° 30’ and 15° 35’ longitude East and 13° 04’ and 18° 00’ latitude North. It covers 156 906 km², and it borders Agadez Region to the north, Chad to the east, Nigeria to the south, and Zinder Region to the west. The landscape is primarily Sahelian in the south, merging into the Sahara desert in the north of the region. In the far southeast can be found Niger's portion of Lake Chad; formerly extending as far west as N'guigmi, the lake has shrunk drastically in recent decades. In the southeast the Komadougou Yobe river forms part of the border with Nigeria.

Settlements
Diffa is the regional capital; other major settlements include Bosso, Chetimari, Dungass, Gueskerou, Goudoumaria, Kablewa, Mainé-Soroa, N'Gourti, N'Guelbély, N'guigmi and Toumour.

Administrative subdivisions 

Diffa Region is divided into three Departments:
 Diffa Department
 Maïne-Soroa Department
 N'guigmi Department

The Region also includes three Urban Communes, a number of Rural Communes, four Cantons, and over twenty Groupments (administrative councils of nomadic communities). The Urban Communes are Diffa, Maïné-Soroa, N'guigmi; while the Rural Communes include Bosso, Chétimari, Goudoumaria, N'gourti, Kabléwa, Nguel beyli, and Gueskérou.

Demographics
The main ethnolinguistic groups in the region are Arabs, Fula, Hausa, Kanuri, Bufuma, and Toubou.

Refugees 
Refugees from Nigeria fleeing violence from Boko Haram are living with local populations in the Diffa Region. As of 11 June 11, 2014, the International Rescue Committee (IRC) estimated that as many as 1,000 refugees a week were crossing the border into Diffa region; four out of five are women and girls. By October 2015 the number of Nigerian refugees in the region had risen to at least 150,000. After a lull in the fighting in 2017-18, violence increased in 2019, further worsening an already fragile security situation.

Economy 

The economy of Diffa Region is primarily agricultural, based upon pastoralism and farming. The major crop, grown both for subsistence and sale, is millet, especially drought-tolerant varieties. One third of arable land is devoted to farming: almost 105,000 hectares farmed of the 299,500 hectares of arable land. Areas of the east and south also grow rice and maize. Irrigation in the valleys around Maïné-Soroa make this possible, as does the edge of Lake Chad (3,000 km² in the far east) and the seasonal Komadougou Yobe river valley in the south, which forms around 150 km of the border with Nigeria. Despite this the Diffa Region is among the most unproductive agricultural areas in Niger, and all of West Africa, making it especially vulnerable to drought and famine.

See also 
 Regions of Niger
 Departments of Niger
 Communes of Niger
 2010 Sahel famine

References 

 Portions of this article were translated from the French language Wikipedia article :fr:Diffa (région), 2008-06-19.

The Wodaabe Of Southeastern Niger. In Nikolaus Schareika. Ecological Knowledge And Herd Movement Strategies Among The Wodaabe Of Southeastern Niger. Institut für Ethnologie und Afrikastudien, Johannes Gutenberg-Universität Mainz/The Food and Agriculture Organization of the United Nations (2003)

External links
Diffa/Niger : Map of attacks by Boko Haram (as of 04 October 2015)

 
Regions of Niger